Upadeśasāhasrī is an 8th-century CE Sanskrit text of Adi Shankara. Considered a Prakaraṇa grantha, the Upadeśasāhasrī is considered among Shankara's most important non-commentarial works.

Content
Upadeśasāhasrī is divided into two parts – one is in metric verse and another is in prose. There are nineteen chapters (prakarana) in the verse (or metrical) part (padyabandha), and three chapters in the prose part. According to Mayeda, "Manuscripts indicate that the two parts were regarded as independent works, as it were, and studied or commented upon separately. They also suggest the possibility that any single chapter could be selected, copied, and studied apart from the rest. This means that reading of the text may begin anywhere." Mayeda further notes that Shankara was primarily concerned with moksha, "and not with the establishment of a complete system of philosophy or theology," following Potter, who qualifies Shankara as a "speculative philosopher."

NB:  starts with the prose part, where  starts with the metrical (verse) part. Here Mayeda's sequence is followed, with I referring to the metrical (verse) part, and II referring to the prose part.

I. Metrical (verse) part
The metrical part "discusses and repeatedly explains many basic problems of Advaita or "non-dualism" from different points of view" in a non-systematical way. Positing that the "I," Atman, is self-evident, Shankara argues that Atman, Awareness, Consciousness, is the True Self, and not the mind and the body. The sruti (scriptures) point to this truth with statements like "Tat Tvam Asi." Comprehending one's true identity is regarded to liberate one from samsara, the cycle of transmigration and rebirth.

Chapter 1. Pure Consciousness
Chapter I.1 starts with the exclamation

Shankara then rejects action as a means to liberation, as it leads to bondage. Since action is related to ignorance, "associated with a misconception of Atman as "I am agent; this is mine," only knowledge of Brahman will lead to liberation. Being ignorant, people assume Atman to be identical to the body. Yet, "[The Sruti passage,] "Not thus! Not so!" (Brh. Up. II,3,6), excluding the body and the like, leaves Atman free from distinction. Therby nescience is removed."

Chapter 2. Negation
Chapter II.2 states that only Atman cannot be negated when inquiring "I am no this, I am not this," thereby arriving at the understanding of Atman.

Chapter 18. That Thou Art
Chapter 18,  Thou Art That, the longest chapter of the Upadeśasāhasrī, is devoted to considerations on the insight "I am ever-free, the existent" (sat), and the statement "Tat Tvam Asi," which according to Shankara's separates the Real, Atman, from the unreal. 

According to Shankara, the I-notion is self-evident, and the statement "I am the existent" refers to the basis of this I-notion, the inner Atman. The sruti explains that the notions "my" and "this" are situated in the intellect, and perishable, while Consciousness and the Seer are immovable and imperishable, thus separating "notions" from Awareness. The statement "Tat Tvam Asi" then is meaningful because it refers to Tat, Atman.

Recognizing oneself as "the Existent-Brahman," which is mediated by scriptural teachings, is contrasted with the notion of "I act," which is mediated by relying on sense-perception and the like. The statement "Thou art That" "remove[s] the delusion of a hearer," "so through sentences as "Thou art That" one knows one's own Atman, the witness of all internal organs," and not from any actions.

According to Shankara, "right knowledge arises at the moment of hearing," and Shankara is ambivalent on the need for meditation on the Upanishadic mahavyaka. He rejects prasamcaksa or prasamkhyana meditation, that is, meditation on the meaning of the sentences, and in Up. II.3 recommends parisamkhyana, in which Atman is separated from everything that is not Atman, that is, the sense-objects and sense-organs, and the pleasant and unpleasant things and merit and demerit connected with them. Yet, Shankara then concludes with declaring that only Atman exists, stating that "all the sentences of the Upanishads concerning non-duality of Atman should be fully contemplated, should be contemplated." As Mayeda states, "how they [prasamcaksa or prasamkhyana versus parisamkhyana] differ from each other in not known."

II. Prose part
The prose part intends to explain "how to teach the means of final release" to seekers. The three chapters seem to correspond with the three stages of sravana (listening to the teachings), manana (thinking about the teachings) and nididhyāsana (meditation on the teachings).

Chapter 1. How to enlighten the pupil
Chapter II.1 opens with the statement

Knowledge of Brahman is to obtained by a worthy pupil from an accomplished teacher, who should train the students in archiving the virtues necessary for proper understanding. The teacher teaches the srutis concerned with the oneness of Atman with Brahman, referring to a large number of sruti-statements. The teacher then continues by reinforcing disiedentification from societal status and the body, The teacher then shows how the sruti and smriti describe the "marks of Atman," explaining how the Atman is different from body, caste, family, and purifying ceremonies. Final release is obtained by the knowledge that Atman is identical to Brahman.

Chapter 2. Awareness

Notes

Quotes

References

Sources
Printed sources

External links
Upadesha sahasri (Sanskrit Original)
 Summary of Upadeśasāhasri
Book Review: Liturgy of Liberation: A Christian Commentary on Shankara's Upadesasahasri by Reid B. Locklin, Reviewer: Anantanand Rambachan (2012), Journal of Hindu-Christian Studies, Vol. 25, Article 19
The Authenticity of the Upadesha Sahasri Ascribed to Saṅkara, Sengaku Mayeda (1965), Journal of the American Oriental Society, Vol. 85, No. 2 (Apr. - Jun 1965), pages 178-196

Indian philosophy
Sanskrit texts
Philosophical literature
Adi Shankara
Advaita Vedanta
Hindu texts
8th-century works
Advaita Vedanta texts